AIH or AiH is an initialism that may refer to:

Codes 
 Air Incheon (ICAO airline designator AIH)
 Ai-Cham language, ISO 639-3 code

Medicine
 Autoimmune hepatitis, a human disease

Others
 American IronHorse, an American motorcycle manufacturer

 As It Happens, a Canadian radio news program broadcast on CBC Radio One